Luis Fernández (born 2 April 1960) is a Costa Rican former footballer. He competed in the men's tournament at the 1980 Summer Olympics, but his team tied for 13th place.

References

External links
 
 

1960 births
Living people
Costa Rican footballers
Costa Rica international footballers
Olympic footballers of Costa Rica
Footballers at the 1980 Summer Olympics
Footballers from San José, Costa Rica
Association football forwards
L.D. Alajuelense footballers
Deportivo Saprissa players
C.S. Herediano footballers
C.S. Cartaginés players
Belén F.C. players
C.S. Uruguay de Coronado players